Daniel Ivan "Dan" Klatt (born October 28, 1978) is a retired American water polo player who competed at the 2004 Summer Olympics, where his team finished in seventh place.

Klatt learned to swim aged 3, from his father, Richard Klatt, an experienced swimming and water polo coach and a former top-level swimmer. He started training in swimming in 1984, but later focused on water polo, only occasionally competing in swimming at the university level. He retired from competitions shortly after the 2004 Olympics to become the head coach of the women's water polo team of the University of California, Irvine. He was also assistant coach with the national women's water polo team in the 2012 & 2016 Olympic Games

References

External links
 

1978 births
Living people
Water polo players at the 2004 Summer Olympics
American male water polo players
Olympic water polo players of the United States
American water polo coaches